Mahajan is an Indian surname and caste which belongs to the Vaishya varna. It signifies the profession of a moneylender, merchants, bankers and administrators.

In the caste system, Mahajan is a trader who belongs to the Vaishya varna and the last name may be found in that caste.

Notable people
Notable people with this surname include:
 Ashwani Mahajan, economist, National Co-Convener, Swadeshi Jagran Manch; Professor at PG DAV College
 Harsh Mahajan, Indian politician
  Mehr Chand Mahajan, former Chief Justice of India and former Prime Minister of Kashmir
 Pramod Mahajan, an Indian politician (Maharashtra State)
 Rahul Mahajan, an American blogger
 Rahul Mahajan, Indian reality TV personality
 Sumitra Mahajan, an Indian politician Who is the speaker of the 16th Lok Sabha
 Vijay Mahajan, former Dean of the Indian School of Business, a Marketing professor at the McCombs School of Business, The University of Texas at Austin
 Vikram Chand Mahajan, an Indian politician, Senior Advocate (Supreme Court of India)
 Girish Mahajan, an Indian politician
 Gulabrao Patil, an Indian politician

References

Vaishya community
Indian surnames
Hindu surnames
Punjabi-language surnames
Punjabi tribes